Reuben Omojola Folasanje Agboola (born 30 May 1962) is a former footballer who played at left back. He made 268 league appearances in a 13-year career in the Football League, and made nine appearances for Nigeria between 1991 and 1993, appearing at the 1992 Africa Cup of Nations.

He began his career as an amateur at Southampton in July 1978, after leaving youth side Cheshunt F.C. He turned professional with the "Saints" in April 1980, and helped the club to reach the FA Cup Semi-finals and to achieve a second-place finish in the First Division in 1983–84. He was sold to Sunderland in January 1985 for £150,000. The club struggled, and he was loaned out to Charlton Athletic in 1986. After regaining his first team spot, he helped Sunderland win back their top-flight status following promotions in 1987–88 and 1989–90. Loaned out to Port Vale in November 1991, he was allowed to move on to Swansea City twelve months later. He ended his career following spells with non-league clubs Woking and Gosport Borough.

Club career

Southampton
Agboola was born in Camden, London. His family moved to Waltham Cross, Hertfordshire when he was a schoolboy where he played for Cheshunt's youth teams whilst also attending Southampton's London Selection Centre. In July 1978, he joined Southampton as an amateur before signing as a professional in April 1980, having made his reserve team debut in April 1979.

His first team debut came at Old Trafford on 29 November 1980, in the same match as Danny Wallace, when the "Saints" held Manchester United to a 1–1 draw.saintsplayers.co.uk After the match manager Lawrie McMenemy said: "I was thrilled coming to Old Trafford ... knowing I would put the two youngsters in. And why not? Matt Busby showed everyone about playing kids at Old Trafford years ago. Even if we had lost I would have enjoyed the game for their sake." He retained his position in the team for the next few games before the fit again Nick Holmes regained his place.

In his first two seasons as a professional he made only eleven appearances, but in November 1982 he eventually claimed the number 3 shirt as his own, ousting Steve Baker, where he formed a partnership with England international Mick Mills. In 1983 McMenemy decided to adopt the continental idea of a sweeper, and Agboola's "quick and alert defending" ideally suited him to the role, to such good effect that in 1983–84 Southampton recorded their highest-ever final position, second place behind Liverpool, as well as reaching the FA Cup Semi-final at Highbury where they lost 1–0 to Everton in extra time. He won the club's Best Away Player award.

After the first six games of the following season he was replaced by Kevin Bond and after a few sporadic appearances, he was sold to Sunderland in January 1985 for £150,000. During his five years as a professional with the Saints, Agboola made a total of 112 appearances in all competitions.

Sunderland
He made his official debut for Sunderland on 29 January 1985 in a 1–0 defeat at his former club, Southampton. He had started in an earlier match at Roker Park against Liverpool, but this match was abandoned because of a frozen pitch and was expunged from the records. He initially found it difficult to hold down a regular first team place as Sunderland struggled in vain to avoid relegation from the First Division at the end of his first season. As Sunderland continued to struggle (now under the management of Agboola's mentor, Lawrie McMenemy), Agboola spent a part of the 1986–87 season on loan at Charlton Athletic.

In the following season he had his best season for Sunderland, as (now under manager Denis Smith) they stormed back into the Second Division as champions of the Third Division. This success was followed two years later by a return to the top flight; the "Black Cats" finished sixth and lost 1–0 to Swindon Town in the play-off Final at Wembley, however Swindon were found to have made illegal payments to their players and so Sunderland were promoted instead.

Sunderland again struggled at the highest level and Agboola was loaned out to Port Vale in November 1990. He played nine games for John Rudge's "Valiants" in 1990–91. He left Roker Park in November 1991, having played 170 games for Sunderland in league and cup competitions.

Later career
Agboola joined Frank Burrows's Swansea City in November 1991 and made 28 appearances before retiring from professional football. The "Swans" battled against relegation in 1991–92, before reaching the play-offs in 1992–93, losing to West Bromwich Albion at the semi-final stage. He subsequently turned out for Woking of the Conference in the 1993–94 season after signing for Geoff Chapple's side in August 1993. He later ended his career at non-league club Gosport Borough.

International career
Agboola was eligible to represent Nigeria due to his father. He was first selected by coach Clemens Westerhof for Nigeria whilst with Sunderland, appearing in an Africa Cup of Nations qualifying match against Ghana on 13 April 1991 thus becoming one of the first non-Nigerian born players to represent his native country. He was born in London to a Nigerian father and English mother. The "Super Eagles" qualified for the 1992 Africa Cup of Nations in Senegal, and made it to the semi-finals, where they were defeated by Ghana; Nigeria then beat Cameroon in the third place play-off. He made a total of nine appearances for Nigeria, seven in the Nations Cup and two in World Cup qualifying matches.

Later life
He returned to Southampton where he became the landlord at the "Sporting View" bar at the Southampton Sports Centre before moving to Majorca in 2004 to run a bar.

Career statistics
Source:}<ref>Sunderland career details}<ref>

Honours
Sunderland
Football League Third Division champion: 1987–88
Football League Second Division play-offs: 1989–90

Nigeria
Africa Cup of Nations third-place finish: 1992

References

1962 births
Footballers from Camden Town
Living people
English people of Nigerian descent
Black British sportsmen
English people of Yoruba descent
Yoruba sportspeople
Nigerian footballers
Nigeria international footballers
Association football fullbacks
Cheshunt F.C. players
Southampton F.C. players
Sunderland A.F.C. players
Charlton Athletic F.C. players
Port Vale F.C. players
Swansea City A.F.C. players
Woking F.C. players
Gosport Borough F.C. players
English Football League players
National League (English football) players
1992 African Cup of Nations players